Lieutenant-General Sir Henry Karslake,  (10 February 1879 – 19 October 1942) was a British Army officer. He was Colonel Commandant, Royal Artillery from 1937 to his death in 1942.

Biography 
The only son of Lewis Karslake, Henry Karslake was educated at Harrow School and Royal Military Academy, Woolwich.

From 1933 until September 1935, he was Commander, Baluchistan District, where he directed the rescue operations in the aftermath of the 1935 Quetta earthquake. Created a KCSI on the relinquishment of his command, he was promoted to Lieutenant-General in April 1936 and appointed KCB in 1937. He retired from the Army in 1938.

During the Second World War, he was briefly recalled to active service to assist with the evacuation of the British Army, and was briefly General Officer Commanding British troops in France in 1940.

References 

 "Lieut.-Gen. Sir Henry Karslake", The Times, 20 October 1942, p. 6.

Bibliography

Further reading

External links
 Generals of World War II

1879 births
1942 deaths
Royal Artillery officers
Knights Commander of the Order of the Bath
Knights Companion of the Order of the Star of India
Companions of the Order of St Michael and St George
Companions of the Distinguished Service Order
People educated at Harrow School
Graduates of the Royal Military Academy, Woolwich
Recipients of the Legion of Honour
Royal Garrison Artillery officers
British Army lieutenant generals
Royal Horse Artillery officers
British Army generals of World War II
British Army personnel of the Second Boer War
British Army personnel killed in World War II